Notiosorex dalquesti, or Dalquest's shrew, is an extinct species of shrew that was found in the southwestern United States and northern Mexico during the Pleistocene and possibly the Holocene.

Fossils of Dalquest's shrew were once thought to belong to the living Crawford's gray shrew but have since been classified as a distinct species.

References

Notiosorex
Fossil taxa described in 2010
Holocene extinctions
Mammals described in 2010
Pleistocene mammals of North America